University of Washington Continuum College, formerly Educational Outreach is the continuing education and professional development unit of the University of Washington (UW), in Seattle, Washington. Founded in 1912, UW Continuum College was originally the branch of the university offering correspondence courses. Today, this UW unit provides wide-ranging programs for non-traditional and lifelong learning students, including degree programs, certificate programs, and select courses through UW Professional & Continuing Education, Massive Open Online Courses (MOOCs), UW in the High School, UW Summer Quarter, UW Summer Youth, UW International & English Language Programs, Osher Institute for Lifelong Learning at the UW, and Conference Services. The programs provided are fee-based and self-sustaining and do not receive state funds for support.

In 2017, UW Continuum College released a new line of professional certificate programs called Career Accelerator, making their most popular programs available in four different formats: in-person, online, accelerated, and self-paced. Also in 2017, UW Continuum College created its first-ever scholarship program. The UW Certificate Scholarship covers 80 to 100 percent of the course fees for qualified applicants of select certificate programs offered through UW Professional & Continuing Education.

Offices for University of Washington Continuum College are located in the University District, Seattle near the UW campus, housed primarily in the UW Tower. The university purchased what is now the UW Tower from Safeco in 2006. Programs include offerings at the main UW campus and at various locations through UW Professional & Continuing Education.

The University of Washington Continuum College is directed by Vice Provost Rovy Branon. Branon oversees a staff of approximately 250 engaged in the development and administration of the UW's various fee-based programs.

Programs
UW Continuum College administers the following programs:
 UW Professional and Continuing Education
 Non-degree enrollment for UW credit classes
 UW Summer Quarter
 UW International & English Language programs
 UW Summer Youth programs
 UW in the High school
 Massive Open Online Courses (MOOCs) on Coursera and edX
 Osher Lifelong Learning Institute at the UW 
 Corporate learning partnerships
 Coding boot-camp

Media Mentions of UW Continuum College 
 KGW8 TV appearance, “Advice for adult learners” (August 21, 2018)
 The Costco Connection article, “Certify yourself” (August 2018)
 Seattle Business article, “Extend Your Education: Lifelong Learning Is the New Reality for a Successful Career” (July 12, 2018)
 The evoLLLution article, “Addressing the Increasing Need for Non-Credit Programming: The University and True Lifelong Education” (June 8, 2018)
 Engineering Career Coach podcast, “How to Evaluate Which Professional Certificates Can Boost Your Career” (May 29, 2018)
 The Seattle Times article, “UW offers coding camp for people looking to shift careers” (May 10, 2018)
 Deseret News article, “What we can learn from the good-guy hackers” (May 2, 2018)
 The Daily article, “UW Continuum College shows that students can interact with UW at any age” (April 25, 2018)
 Tech Republic interview, “Questions developers should ask before jumping into a certificate program” (April 12, 2018)
 Crain's article, “If I Knew Then...” (March 8, 2018)
 Test and Code podcast, “Continuing Education and Certificate Programs at UW” (January 31, 2018)
 The News Tribune article, “How can I make a living without driving to Seattle? Report offers some hope.” (February 16, 2018)
 Puget Sound Business Journal article, “'Nothing is standing still anymore' in continuing education ” (December 8, 2017)
 The Seattle Times article, “Seattle’s newcomers vs. longtime residents: At least we both like the Seahawks” (September 21, 2017)
 Q13 Fox article, “New survey highlights the reason thousands are relocating to Seattle” (September 21, 2017)
 USA Today article, “Is going back to school right for you?” (September 17, 2017)
 Forbes article, “Going Back To College To Advance Your Career” (September 12, 2017)
 GeekWire article, “Working Geek: Business vet turned UW vice provost helps professionals learn in-demand tech skills” (June 14, 2017)
 U.S. News & World Report article, “Is Continuing Education Right for My Career?” (June 8, 2017)
 The Seattle Times article, “Making continuing education possible for more adults” (June 2, 2017)

References

External links 
 University of Washington Continuum College homepage
 University of Washington homepage

Adult education in the United States
University of Washington
Educational institutions established in 1912
1912 establishments in Washington (state)